The following list includes notable people who were born or have lived in Hanover, New Hampshire.

Academics and writing 

 Philip Booth (1925–2007), poet
 C. Loring Brace (1930–2019), anthropologist
 Gerald Warner Brace (1901–1978), writer, educator, sailor, boat builder
 Francis Brown (1849–1916), Semitic scholar
 Bill Bryson (born 1951), author
 James Freeman Clarke (1810–1888), preacher, author
 Richard Eberhart (1904–2005), Pulitzer Prize-winning poet
 Janet Evanovich (born 1943), writer
Barbara Newhall Follett (1914–disappeared 1939), author; in December 1939, aged 25, Follett reportedly became depressed with her marriage and walked out of her apartment, never to be seen again
 Richard Foster (1826–1901), abolitionist, educator
 Joan Halifax (born 1942), Zen Buddhist teacher, anthropologist, ecologist, civil rights activist, hospice caregiver, author
 Virginia Heffernan (born 1969), critic, columnist, author
 Grace Webster Haddock Hinsdale (1832–1902), author 
 Paul D. Paganucci (1931–2001), investment banker, university educator, college financial administrator, businessman
 Jodi Picoult (born 1966), author
 Mary Roach (born 1959), author
 Kate Sanborn (1839–1917), author, teacher, lecturer, reviewer, compiler, essayist, farmer 
 Armstrong Sperry (1897–1976), writer-illustrator of children's literature
 Eleazar Wheelock (1711–1779), college founder

Arts 
 Nicol Allan (1931–2019), artist
 Dave Cole (born 1975), contemporary sculptor

Business and design 

 Hal Barwood, game developer
 George Bissell (1821–1884), industrialist 
 William Kamkwamba (born 1987), inventor, author
 Olin Stephens (1908–2008), yacht designer

Media 

 Jack Beatty (born 1945), writer, commentator
 Tom Dey (born 1965), film director
 Brad Feldman (born 1967), television and radio announcer
 Dana Vespoli, pornographic actress

Medical 
 Dixi Crosby (1800–1873), surgeon, educator at Dartmouth College
C. Everett Koop (1916–2013), Surgeon General of the United States

Military 

 Thomas C. Kinkaid (1888–1972), U.S. Navy admiral during WWII

Music 

 Al Barr (born 1968), vocalist for Dropkick Murphys
 Kent Carter (born 1939), jazz musician
 Ken Chastain (born 1964), musician, engineer, producer
 Charlie Clouser (born 1963), keyboardist, composer, record producer, remixer
 Jon Spencer (born 1965), singer, composer, guitarist
 Sir Babygirl (born 1993), singer, songwriter, guitarist
 Noah Kahan (born 1997), singer-songwriter

Politics and law 

 Henry Fowle Durant (1822–1881), lawyer, philanthropist
 Jonathan Freeman (1745–1808), U.S. congressman
 C. Everett Koop (1916–2013), 13th U.S. Surgeon General
 Sean Patrick Maloney (born 1966), U.S. congressman
 James W. Patterson (1823–1893), U.S. congressman and senator
 James W. Ripley (1786–1835), attorney, Jacksonian U.S. congressman
 Samuel Taggart (1754–1825), U.S. congressman
 Daniel Webster (1782–1852), U.S. congressman, senator from Massachusetts
 Leonard Wilcox (1799–1850), U.S. senator

Sports 

 Barbara Bedford (born 1972), Olympic swimmer
 Nate Fish (born 1980), baseball player and coach
 Hilary Knight (born 1989), women's hockey forward; 2010 and 2014 Olympic silver medalist
 Kevin Pearce (born 1987), former professional snowboarder; competed professionally from 2007 to 2009, when a crash during snowboard training left him with a traumatic brain injury
 Ben True (born 1985), runner; World Cross Country Championships silver medalist (2013)

References

Hanover, New Hampshire
Hanover